The modified triadan system is a scheme of dental nomenclature that can be used widely across different animal species. It is used worldwide among veterinary surgeons.

Each tooth is given a three digit number.

The first number relates to the quadrant of the mouth in which the tooth lies:
 upper right
 upper left
 lower left
 lower right

If it is a deciduous tooth that is being referred to, then a different number is used:
upper right
upper left
lower left
lower right

The second and third numbers refer to the location of the tooth from front to back (or rostral to caudal). This starts at 01 and goes up to 11 for many species, depending on the total number of teeth.

References

 
 

Mammal anatomy
Horse anatomy
Zoology